Rudolf Finsterer (born 5 May 1951) is a retired German international rugby union player and coach, formerly coaching the RG Heidelberg in the Rugby-Bundesliga and, until the 20 March 2010, the German national rugby union team.

Finsterer resigned from his position of coach of Germany at the end of the country's European Nation Cup campaign, after suffering defeat in every match and relegation. He was bitterly disappointed about the relegation, considering his ten years in the position of coach of Germany wasted. He was succeeded by Torsten Schippe as coach of Germany, the very man he himself succeeded in 2001.

Finsterer shared his duties as coach of Germany with Bruno Stolorz from the RC Orléans. Stolorz was seconded to the German team by the Fédération française de rugby to improve Germany's performance in the sport.

On club level, Finsterer coached the RG Heidelberg since 2002, with an interruption in the 2008-09 season. At the end of the 2010-11 season, he retired from coaching and instead stepped into the role of a team manager with RG Heidelberg.

Finsterer lives in Mannheim and, while coach of Germany, worked under the Bundestrainer Peter Ianusevici, who holds a position of director of rugby in Germany.

Coaching honours

Club
 German rugby union championship
 Champions: 2006, 2007
 German rugby union cup
 Winner: 2004
 Runners up: 2006, 2007, 2008

National team
 European Nations Cup - Division 2
 Champions: 2008

References

External links
   Rudolf Finsterer at totalrugby.de

1951 births
Living people
German rugby union coaches
Germany national rugby union team coaches
German rugby union players
Germany international rugby union players
Sportspeople from Mannheim